Sanshin or Sansin are local mountain-spirits in Korean Shamanism and folk-beliefs. In South Korea, most Buddhist temples and major Shamanic-shrines, and some traditionalist villages have a dedicated shrine called a sanshin-gak or an altar called a sanshin-dan dedicated to the local sanshin.  This nature-deity is typically represented in the enshrined icons (paintings and/or statues) as an elder male (in rare cases, mature female) figure in royal-Confucian clothing, always accompanied by at least one tiger and a Korean Red Pine tree.  There are many other symbols being held by the Sanshin, offered to him by servants or in the backgrounds of the more elaborate paintings, derived from Oriental Daoism, Buddhism, Neo-Confucianism, shamanic-folklore and Korean 'spiritual-ethnic nationalism' -- making these multi-religious icons unique in the entire world.

The Sanshin faith is interpreted in the folk scene as a belief devoted to the mountain gods. The mountain's beauty, its mystery, and the perceived shape that soars toward the sky are combined to inspire mountain worship on an emotional level. The faith that the mountain is believed-in as a mystical body that provides abundance and protection is very ancient in all Korea, and continues today in public or private Sanshin-je (mountain-spirit ceremonies) Seonang-gut (tutelary-deity rituals). When the mountain is located between Heaven and the earth where human beings live, and serves as a link between those two worlds, it is believed to be a representation of the universal world mountain, thought by traditional religions like Hinduism, Buddhism and Geomancy to rise at the center of the world.

There are particular shamanic-folklore individual Sanshins, such as Eunje-san Seongmo (Hangul: 운제산성모; Hanja: 雲梯山聖母), who is the wife of Namhae Yong-wang or Dragon King of the South Sea, Jiri-san Seongmo Cheonwang (Hangul: 지리산성모천왕) or Exquisite-Wisdom Mountain Holy-Mother Heaven-king, and Mireuk Sanshin Halmi (Hangeul: 미륵산신할미) or Future-Buddha Mountain-spirit Grandma, to name just a few.

Some prominent Chinese mountains have shrines to similar deities in the Daoist traditions, called Shanshen 山神.
The Japanese equivalent is the Yama-no-Kami (山の神; also pronounced as yamagami).

See also
 Hou Tu
 Lords of the Three Mountains
 Shigandang
 Tu Di Gong
 Yama-no-Kami

References

Prof. David A. Mason maintains a gigantic website about Korean Sanshin Mountain-spirits, at 

He published the landmark book on this topic in 1999, "Spirit Of The Mountains: Korea's San-shin and Traditions of Mountain-Worship" 

Mountain gods
Korean mythology